Júlio César Miranda de Oliveira (born 4 February 1986 in Paranavaí, Paraná) is a Brazilian athlete specialising in the javelin throw. He won the gold medal at the 2003 World Youth Championships. In addition, he has won multiple medals at the regional level.

His personal best of 83.67 metres, set in 2015, is the current national record.

Personal bests
Discus throw (1.500 kg): 56.17 m –  São Caetano do Sul, 25 May 2003
Javelin throw: 83.67 m –  São Bernardo do Campo, 11 July 2015
Javelin throw (700g): 81.16 m –  Sherbrooke, 11 July 2003

Competition record

*: At the 2008 Ibero-American Championships, Júlio César de Oliveira was initially 4th, but Colombian Noraldo Palacios was disqualified because of doping violations.

Seasonal bests by year

2001 - 61.29
2002 - 69.52
2003 - 72.52
2004 - 74.42
2005 - 76.81
2006 - 78.91
2007 - 77.65
2008 - 76.65
2009 - 80.05
2011 - 77.70
2012 - 75.66
2013 - 77.23
2014 - 79.10
2015 - 83.67 NR
2016 - 81.56

References

External links
 
 

1986 births
Living people
Brazilian male javelin throwers
Athletes (track and field) at the 2007 Pan American Games
Athletes (track and field) at the 2011 Pan American Games
Pan American Games athletes for Brazil
Athletes (track and field) at the 2015 Pan American Games
World Athletics Championships athletes for Brazil
Pan American Games bronze medalists for Brazil
Athletes (track and field) at the 2016 Summer Olympics
Olympic athletes of Brazil
Pan American Games medalists in athletics (track and field)
South American Games gold medalists for Brazil
South American Games silver medalists for Brazil
South American Games medalists in athletics
Competitors at the 2002 South American Games
Competitors at the 2006 South American Games
Competitors at the 2014 South American Games
Medalists at the 2015 Pan American Games
Sportspeople from Paraná (state)
20th-century Brazilian people
21st-century Brazilian people